Heiti is an Estonian-language male given name.

People named Heiti include:
 Heiti Hääl (born 1963), Estonian entrepreneur and sports personality
 Heiti Talvik (1904–1947), Estonian poet

References

Estonian masculine given names